Saint Fris, also known as Fris de Bassoues, is a saint worshiped in the region Aquitaine, département Gers, in France. Especially in the communities of Bassoues, Gazax-Baccarisse, Lupiac, Peyrusse-Vieille, Préneron, Saint-Go and in Vic-Fezensac, devotion Saint Fris exists or existed. The basilica of Bassoues is named Basilique Saint-Fris. The nearby lake is named Lac de Saint-Fris. Saint Fris is associated with curing ailments and is the patron of those with plague and crippled young women.

Biography 

Fris, meaning 'the Frisian', was a commander of a Frankish army during the rule of maior domo Charles Martel. He died in the year AD 732. According to legend, Fris was the son of the heathen king of Frisia, King Radbod, and nephew of the Frankish statesman Charles Martel. His name is unknown, only his origin Frisia. According to the Vita Vulframni, written around 800, King Radbod had a son, and who was baptised, but no name of his son is given in the vita. According to the Annales Mettenses Priores, dated around 800, Grimoald (the son of maior domo Pepin of Herstal) had a son who was named Theudoald but apparently was a bastard son of Grimoald's concubine. The theud or thud element of his name, however, makes it possible he was actually the son of Radbod’s daughter named Thudsinda. The marriage between Grimoald and Thudsinda in AD 711 is historic. It remains speculation who Fris was. The history of Saint Fris is based on a lost document in possession of abbot Aignan de Sendat (1681-1764).

Battle of l'Étendard 
In the year AD 732, the Umayyad Caliphate advanced into the region Aquitaine. This would lead to the great Battle of Tours in October that year. According to legend Charles Martel assigned commander Fris to scout with a smaller army the advancement of the Umayyad army. This led to two confrontation in June that year. The first battle took place near Lupiac and was lost by the Franks. But Fris regrouped his forces on a hill near La Tapia, modern Bassoues. On this plateau, on June 24, he planted his standard and confronted the Umayyads a second time. This is the reason why the battle is called the Battle of l'Étendard 'the standard'. The second battle was won by the Franks, but at the loss of Fris' life. He was hit by an arrow in his thigh, and was carried from the battlefield by his horse. At the banks of the stream Guiroue he died and was buried.

The fact Frisians were fighting in Frankish armies is not unique. Frisian (and Saxon) contingents fought for example for the Frankish kingdom against the Slavs and the Avars, which brought them even to the River Danube in modern Hungary.

Another interesting aspect is that Fris was riding a horse. It might be that Fris was part a cavalry unit. A small cavalry scout army to observe the movements of the Umayyad army and to design the best military strategy. This would stroke with the assignment of Charles Martel. Frisians kept horses during the Early Middle Ages already. In the High Middle Ages, Frisians were even well-known horse breeders, exporting their horses all over Europe. In the chanson de geste and the epos La Chevalerie Ogier de Danemarche, none other than the illustrious Charlemagne rides a ceval Frise ‘Frisian horse’. What is more, Friesian horses were renown as thé chargeur ‘war horse’ throughout the Middle Ages, and centuries after.

Basilica Saint Fris, Bassoues 
According to legendary tradition, the sarcophagus of Saint Fris was discovered two centuries after his death by a farmer witnessed strange behaviour of one of his cows. They refused to eat and repeatedly licked the same stone. After moving the stone, the farmer unearthed a sarcophagus containing the preserved body, armor and weapons of Fris. Shortly after, the villagers built a chapel at their church for the devotion of Saint Fris. When they wanted to transfer the body to it, no beast of burden could move the carriage. When they realized the cow that had been licking the stone all that time should pull the carriage, it succeeded. With ease the cow transferred the remains to the church.

From this time onward, miracles started to happen and the village of Bassoues became a place of pilgrimage. As happens often during a translatio ‘transfer of relics’, also a sweet well or quickborn sprang up where the body of Saint Fris had been buried for centuries. One of the first miracles that happened was when a woman from the nearby hamlet Andréou used water from the well to make dough, it turned into blood.

The first time the church of Bassoues appears in written sources is in the year 1020. In a charter of November that year, kept in the monastery of Saint Michel in Pessan, is recorded that the castle and ecclesia beati Frisii ‘church of the blessed Frisian’ of Bassoues are donated to the monastery of Pessan, under the condition a new basilica and monastery will be built large enough to receive all the pilgrims from everywhere, and for all who are on their way to Santiago de Compostella. 

In 1047, indeed, a monastery had been built at the basilica. However, the Crusades, many medieval wars, the Huguenots who set fire to the basilica, and last but not least, the French Revolution, all did not do much good to the basilica and the monastery of Bassoues. At the end of the fourteenth century a new church was built, but now inside the walls of the village. Consequently, the monastery and the basilica of Saint Fris fell into disrepair fully. Its crypt survived everything, though. In the nineteenth century, the basilica was restored and in the year 1857 relics of Saint Fris, kept in Peyrusse-Grande during the French Wars of Religion, were returned.

References

External links 

 Like Father, Unlike Son. Frisia Coast Trail (2021)

Catholic saints
8th-century deaths
Medieval Frisians

Year of birth missing
732 deaths